Michael Edward Mills (born December 17, 1958) is an American multi-instrumentalist, singer, and composer who was a founding member of the alternative rock band R.E.M. Though known primarily as the bass guitarist and backing vocalist of R.E.M., his musical repertoire also includes keyboards and occasional lead vocals. He contributed to a majority of the band's musical compositions and is the only member to have had formal musical training.

Early life 
Michael Edward Mills was born to Frank and Adora Mills in Orange County, California, where his father was stationed in the Marines. The family moved to Macon, Georgia, when Mills was around six months old. Mills met future R.E.M. bandmate Bill Berry while they attended high school in Macon. The duo started out in bands together. Early projects included the band Shadowfax, later called The Back Door Band.

Mills attended the University of Georgia in Athens, which is where R.E.M. formed.

Career 
Mills is credited with being the chief composer behind many of R.E.M.'s songs, including "Nightswimming",  "Find the River", "At My Most Beautiful", "Why Not Smile", "Let Me In", "Wendell Gee", "(Don't Go Back To) Rockville",  "Beat a Drum", "Be Mine", "Electrolite", and "What's the Frequency, Kenneth?" In particular, R.E.M.'s 2004 album Around the Sun was heavily shaped by Mills' piano and keyboard contributions.

Mills is responsible for the prominent backing vocal and harmony parts found in the band's back catalog, with his vocal contributions being most noticeable on 1986's Lifes Rich Pageant and 2008's Accelerate. He sang lead vocals on the songs "Texarkana", "Near Wild Heaven", The Clique cover "Superman" and The Troggs cover "Love Is All Around".

R.E.M. had been talking about disbanding since 2008, and eventually did so in 2011. In a 2013 interview, Mills said there is no possibility of an R.E.M. reunion. Mills described it as "31 wonderful years and the opportunity to end it on our own terms".

Mills has written and performed with friends on various projects during his time with the band and since. In 1990 he wrote music for Howard Libov's short film Men Will Be Boys. That same year, he recorded with Warren Zevon together with Buck and Berry as the Hindu Love Gods.

In 2012, Mills contributed piano to a Record Store Day single released by Drive-By Truckers member Patterson Hood, in protest of a Walmart development being built in Athens, Georgia.

Mills is a member, along with Steve Wynn, Scott McCaughey, Peter Buck, and Linda Pitmon, of The Baseball Project.

Mills performs as part of singer-songwriter Joseph Arthur's band. On April 3, 2014, while performing with Arthur, Mills broke the news that David Letterman would be retiring in 2015. Mills took a band self-portrait that he posted to Instagram and did a short interview about "breaking" the story.

Since 2010, Mills has played with a rotating group of musicians for a series of concerts built around Big Star's album Third/Sister Lovers. Known as Big Star's Third, the concerts have taken place in London, Sydney, Chicago, Seattle, Los Angeles, and New York. A longtime Big Star fan, Mills wrote the liner notes for the 2014 reissue of the band's first two releases, 1972's #1 Record and 1974's Radio City.

In 2016, he toured to support a Concerto for Violin, Rock Band, and String Orchestra with childhood friend Robert McDuffie, along with guitar players William Tonks and John Neff. The tour resumed in 2022.

Musical style 
Mills' melodic approach to bass playing is inspired by Paul McCartney of the Beatles and Chris Squire of Yes; Mills has said, "I always played a melodic bass, like a piano bass in some ways ... I never wanted to play the traditional locked into the kick drum, root note bass work." Mills has more musical training than his bandmates, which he has said "made it easier to turn abstract musical ideas into reality."

During R.E.M.'s career, Mills often harmonized with Michael Stipe in songs; in the chorus for "Stand", Mills and Stipe alternate singing lyrics, creating a dialogue.

Discography 

1984 – Hindu Love Gods – "Gonna Have a Good Time Tonight"/"Narrator".
1985 – Full Time Men– Full Time Men, organ on "One More Time"
1987 – Warren Zevon – Sentimental Hygiene on "Sentimental Hygiene", "Boom Boom Mancini", "The Factory", "Trouble Waiting to Happen", "Detox Mansion", "Bad Karma", "Even a Dog Can Shake Hands", and "The Heartache"
1987 – Waxing Poetics– Hermitage, production
1988 – Billy James – Sixes and Sevens, production
1988 – The Cynics – "What's It Gonna Be"/"Roadrunner" (live)
1989 – Indigo Girls – Indigo Girls, bass guitar on "Tried to Be True"
1989 – Vibrating Egg – Come On in Here If You Want To, writing and performance
1990 – Kevn Kinney – MacDougal Blues
1990 – Hindu Love Gods – Hindu Love Gods
1990 – Hindu Love Gods – "Raspberry Beret"
1991 – Nikki Sudden – The Jewel Thief
1991 – Nikki Sudden – "I Belong to You"
1991 – The Troggs – Athens, Andover
1991 – Robbie Robertson – Storyville, singing on "Shake This Town"
1992 – Jane Pratt Show theme music
1993 – Automatic Baby – "One"
1993 – The Smashing Pumpkins – Siamese Dream, piano on "Soma"
1993 – Three Walls Down – Building Our House, production
1993 – Three Walls Down – "Steps"/"Wooden Nails"/"Faith in These Times" (live)
1994 – Backbeat soundtrack
1994 – Victoria Williams – Loose, vocals on "You R Loved"
2000 – Christy McWilson – The Lucky One
2006 – Various artists – Big Star Small World, bass guitar on "The Ballad of El Goodo", with Matthew Sweet
2006 – Mike Mills and Sally Ellyson – "Jesus Christ", a Big Star song covered for a charity single for the Red Apple Foundation
2007 – Mudville – Iris Nova, piano on "Eternity"
2008 – Modern Skirts – All of Us in Our Night, production on "Motorcade"
2008 – The Baseball Project – Volume 1: Frozen Ropes and Dying Quails
2009 – Favorite Son soundtrack – "Gift of the Fathers"
2009 – Jill Hennessy – Ghost in My Head, backing vocals on "Erin"
2009 – The Baseball Project – Homerun EP
2010 – Various artists – The Voice Project, cover of Billy Bragg's "Sing Their Souls Back Home"
2011 – The Baseball Project – Volume 2: High and Inside
2011 – The Baseball Project – The Broadside Ballads
2012 – Jason Ringenberg – Nature Jams – vocals on one track
2012 – Patterson Hood & The Downtown 13 – "After It's Gone"/"Unspoken Pretties" – performance on A-side, single released for Record Store Day 
2014 – The Baseball Project – 3rd
2022 – Superchunk - Wild Loneliness, vocal on "On the Floor"

Personal life 
Mills is an avid fantasy sports player, with interest in NFL, NBA, and PGA teams, among others. He is also a fan of his alma mater's football team, the Georgia Bulldogs.

He is married to Jasmine Pahl. He is an atheist.

Mills has one sibling, younger brother Mitch, who is also a musician.

Notes and references

External links 
 

1958 births
American rock bass guitarists
American male bass guitarists
Living people
American atheists
Melodica players
Writers from Athens, Georgia
Musicians from Orange County, California
R.E.M. members
Songwriters from California
The Minus 5 members
American alternative rock musicians
American rock songwriters
American male songwriters
Alternative rock bass guitarists
Alternative rock keyboardists
American rock pianists
American organists
American male organists
American rock keyboardists
Musicians from Athens, Georgia
The Baseball Project members
Hindu Love Gods (band) members
Guitarists from Georgia (U.S. state)
Guitarists from California
Record producers from California
Record producers from Georgia (U.S. state)
20th-century American singers
21st-century American singers
20th-century American guitarists
21st-century American guitarists
American male pianists
21st-century organists
21st-century American keyboardists
20th-century organists
20th-century American keyboardists